Wayne John Pearce OAM (born 29 March 1960 in Balmain, New South Wales) is an Australian former professional rugby league footballer and coach. An athletic  for the Balmain Tigers, he was known as Junior. Pearce represented New South Wales in the State of Origin Series as well as the Australian national rugby league team. Pearce also made an appearance the 1988 Australian television movie The First Kangaroos, which depicted the 1908–09 Kangaroo tour of Great Britain.

Coaching career
Pearce took over as Balmain coach in 1994, and coached Balmain for six seasons before they merged with the Western Suburbs Magpies.  In 2000, Pearce became the inaugural coach of the Wests Tigers but stepped down after one season.  Pearce also coached New South Wales for three seasons and in 2000 led New South Wales to a clean sweep winning the series 3–0. In 2001, Pearce coached NSW in what would prove to be his last series. His last game in charge was the victory by Queensland over NSW 40–14.

Accolades
In February 2008, Pearce was named in the list of Australia's 100 Greatest Players (1908–2007), which was commissioned by the NRL and ARL to celebrate the code's centenary year in Australia.

References

External links

1960 births
Living people
Australian rugby league coaches
Australian rugby league commentators
Australian Rugby League Commissioners
Australian rugby league players
Balmain Tigers players
Australia national rugby league team players
Balmain Tigers coaches
Wests Tigers coaches
City New South Wales rugby league team players
New South Wales City Origin rugby league team players
Recipients of the Australian Sports Medal
Recipients of the Medal of the Order of Australia
New South Wales Rugby League State of Origin players
New South Wales Rugby League State of Origin captains
New South Wales Rugby League State of Origin coaches
Rugby league second-rows
Rugby league players from Sydney
Rugby league locks